Wilmot United Brethren Church is a historic church on Massillon Street (OH 62) in Wilmot, Ohio.

It was built in 1869 and added to the National Register in 1976.

References

Churches on the National Register of Historic Places in Ohio
Greek Revival church buildings in Ohio
Gothic Revival church buildings in Ohio
Italianate architecture in Ohio
Churches completed in 1869
Churches in Stark County, Ohio
National Register of Historic Places in Stark County, Ohio
1869 establishments in Ohio
Italianate church buildings in the United States